Hoda Hadir Abdelamir Khalaf (born 19 December 1997) is a Swedish-born Moroccan footballer who plays as a forward for Sätra SK and the Morocco women's national team.

Club career
Khalaf has played for Sollentuna FK, Bele Barkarby FF, Sätra and Rågsveds IF in Sweden.

International career
Khalaf made her senior debut for Morocco on 10 June 2021 as a 74th-minute substitution in a 3–0 friendly home win over Mali.

See also
List of Morocco women's international footballers

References

1997 births
Living people
Citizens of Morocco through descent
Moroccan women's footballers
Women's association football forwards
Morocco women's international footballers
Swedish women's footballers
Sollentuna FK players
Swedish people of Moroccan descent
Sportspeople of Moroccan descent